Mtulazaji Davis, better known by his stage name Peace (usually styled P.E.A.C.E.) is a rapper from Los Angeles, California. He is a member of Freestyle Fellowship along with Aceyalone, Myka 9 and Self Jupiter. He has released two solo albums.

History
Peace grew up mostly in Los Angeles, California. However, he stated that he lived in Dallas, Texas for about ten years. In elementary school, he played the accordion. He picked up the double bass when he had joined his school's marching band. When he returned to Los Angeles, Peace started playing the saxophone.

In an interview, Peace stated he started rapping in his high school years in the mid to late 1980s. One of his friends had told him that there was a guy who rapped just like him at The Good Life Cafe, a local open-mic venue, named Myka 9. Not believing his friend, he went to go check out Myka 9 at The Good Life Cafe. Peace waited around for a while, but Myka 9 didn't show up. So then he got up on stage and performed for a bit and blew a few whigs back. With no luck, Peace had to wait until the next Thursday night. When he returned, Myka 9 was there. Peace listened to him perform and somewhat agreed with his friend. They both had the fast rapping down, but Myka 9 had his own style. Aceyalone was there that night and had asked Peace what his name was. Peace said "Mtulazaji". Aceyalone then asked what his rap name was and he replied with "Peace".

Released independently and distributed by tape collectors, Freestyle Fellowship's first album To Whom It May Concern... was a landmark. Although it only contains a few songs where they all rap together, each individual rapper's songs truly showcased each of their styles. Peace had two songs, "Physical Form" and "For No Reason", on the album. Their second album, Innercity Griots, has been described as "an acknowledged underground masterpiece".

Peace released his first solo album, Southern Fry'd Chicken, in 2000. His second solo album, Megabite, was released in 2004.

Style

He is also known for his freestyle rap having gone to battle with Eyedea but lost to him at Scribble Jam in 1999.

Film
Peace is featured in the award-winning documentary This Is the Life, chronicling the music movement that was birthed at The Good Life Cafe in South Central, Los Angeles. The Good Life Cafe is the open-mic workshop where he first performed with Freestyle Fellowship in the early 1990s.

Discography
Solo
 Southern Fry'd Chicken (2000)
 Megabite (2004)

with Freestyle Fellowship
 To Whom It May Concern... (1991)
 Innercity Griots (1993)
 Temptations (2001)
 Shockadoom (2002)
 The Promise (2011)

Guest appearances
 Aceyalone - "B-Boy Kingdom" from All Balls Don't Bounce (1995)
 Omid - "When the Sun Took a Day Off and the Moon Stood Still" "You Are in My Clutches" "What Up" from Beneath the Surface (1998)
 Fat Jack - "I Don't Gang Bang" "It's a Packed House" from Cater to the DJ (1999)
 Haiku D'Etat - "Kaya" from Haiku D'Etat (1999)
 The A-Team - "O.G. Crew (Heavyweights Round 3)" from Who Framed the A-Team?
 Aceyalone - "Microphones" from Accepted Eclectic (2000)
 Abstract Rude + Tribe Unique - "Heavyweights Round 4" from P.A.I.N.T. (2001)
 Daddy Kev - "Walking on Water" from Lost Angels (2001)
 Fat Jack - "Talk to Your Brotha" from Cater to the DJ 2 (2004)
 Diplo - "Indian Thick Jawns" from Florida (2004)
 Blackalicious - "Ego Sonic War Drums" from The Craft (2005)
 Myka 9 - "Viles" from Citrus Sessions Vol.1 (2006)

Compilation appearances
 "Heavyweights Round 2" on Project Blowed (1995)
 "Rhyme Crime Stoppers" on Tags of the Times 3 (2001)

References

External links 
 P.E.A.C.E. on SoundCloud
 

Living people
Rappers from Los Angeles
West Coast hip hop musicians
21st-century American rappers
Year of birth missing (living people)
Project Blowed